Bembecia ichneumoniformis, the six-belted clearwing, is a moth of the family Sesiidae.

Distribution
This species can be found in most of Europe and Asia Minor, the Caucasus, northern Iran and the Near East.

Habitat
Bembecia ichneumoniformis prefers calcareous soils, sea-cliffs  and quarries.

Description
The wingspan of Bembecia ichneumoniformis can reach . The body of these moths is black, with six yellow narrow transversal bands in males (hence the common name), while the females may have only five yellow bands. Antennae are relatively thick. In males they are usually black, while in the females they may be either black with an ocher band or basically ocher with a black apex. The front wings show a yellowish or orange apex, a yellow orange spot separating two transparent areas and brownish orange margins. The abdominal brush is black with yellow lines. Legs are yellow.

Rather similar species are Pyropteron muscaeformis, Bembecia scopigera and Bembecia albanensis.

Like all the moths of the family Sesiidae, this species is similar in appearance and flight to a hymenopteran more than to a lepidopteran. The wings are partially free of scales (transparent areas) and narrower and more elongated than those of other butterfly families. In fact the Latin name ichneumoniformis means that its shape and colors, as well as the structure of its wings, evokes  certain ichneumonids, not a butterfly.

It is likely that the alternating yellow and black bands protects this species from certain predators that associate these colors with those of insects with darts and venom such as wasps and bees.

Biology
Adults are on wing from June to August in western Europe. It is a day-flying species.

The larvae feed on the roots of Lotus species and Anthyllis vulneraria. Other recorded food plants include Lotus corniculatus, Ononis spinosa, Dorycnium pentaphyllum, Dorycnium germanicum, Dorycnium herbaceum, Dorycnium hirsutum, Medicago, Hippocrepis comosa, Lupinus polyphyllus, Tetragonolobus maritimus and Lathyrus pratensis.

The caterpillar may be parasitized by other insects, particularly by Tachinidae species (especially Bithia demotica and Bithia proletaria, Bithia glirina and Leskia aurea).

Males are attracted by certain molecules, some of which also attract other species of butterflies (Tineidae et Choreutidae).

Gallery

Bibliography
 Jackie A. McKern, Allen L. Szalanski, Donn T. Johnson, and Ashley P. G. Dowling, Molecular Phylogeny of Sesiidae (Lepidoptera) Inferred From Mitochondrial DNA Sequences ; J. Agric. Urban Entomol. 25(3): 165–177 (July 2008)
 B Verdcourt, Additions to the Wild Fauna and Flora of the Royal Botanic Gardens, Kew XXXV. Miscellaneous Records - Kew Bulletin, 2004 - (Lien vers JSTOR)

References

External links

 UKmoths
 Lepiforum
 Paolo Mazzei, Daniel Morel, Raniero Panfili Moths and Butterflies of Europe and North Africa
 Svenska fjärilar

Sesiidae
Moths described in 1775
Moths of Asia
Moths of Europe
Taxa named by Michael Denis
Taxa named by Ignaz Schiffermüller